Meleana may refer to:

Meleana (musician) (born 1988), American Christian musician
Meleana Shim  (born 1991), American soccer player

See also
Melania, given name
Melena, type of feces